Erni Vales is an American graffiti artist from New York City.

Early life

Career
While attending High School of Art and Design in New York, he made his first artist appearances at Graffiti Productions Inc., one of the first galleries to feature authentic graffiti work of the era. Vales' first professional jobs included graffiti murals in dance clubs in New York.

Personal life

Achievements and honours

References

External links 
Official Website www.evlworld.com
EVL World on Facebook 

Living people
Year of birth missing (living people)
American graffiti artists
High School of Art and Design alumni